The Story of Pretty Boy Floyd is a 1974 American TV movie. It was written and directed by Clyde Ware.

Cast
Martin Sheen as Charles Arthur 'Pretty Boy' Floyd
Kim Darby as Ruby Hardgrave
Michael Parks as Bradley Floyd
Steven Keats as Eddie Richetti
Ellen Corby as Ma Floyd
Abe Vigoda as Dominic Morrell
Joe Estevez as E.W. Floyd 
Ford Rainey as Mr. Suggs

Reception
The Los Angeles Times said the film was the best of all the Great Depression-era gangster films that followed the success of Bonnie and Clyde (1967).

The Washington Post called it "a slick piece of work, smoothly constructed, ably photographed, convincingly acted."

References

External links

The Story of Pretty Boy Floyd at Letterbox DVD

1974 television films
1974 films
American television films
American crime drama films
Films directed by Clyde Ware
1970s American films